The 1959 Clemson Tigers baseball team represented Clemson University in the 1959 NCAA University Division baseball season. The team played their home games at Riggs Field in Clemson, South Carolina.

The team was coached by Bill Wilhelm, who completed his second season at Clemson.  The Tigers reached the 1959 College World Series, their second appearance in Omaha.

Roster

Schedule

References

Clemson
Clemson Tigers baseball seasons
Atlantic Coast Conference baseball champion seasons
College World Series seasons